Indiana's 2nd congressional district is an electoral district for the U.S. Congress in Northern Indiana. It includes South Bend and Elkhart.

On November 8, 2022, Republican candidate Rudy Yakym won both the special election, to complete the rest of Jackie Walorski's term, who died in a car accident August 3, 2022.
, and the regular election for the next two-year term.

Election results from presidential races

History
Prior to 2002, the 2nd congressional district covered east central Indiana, including most of the territory now in the 6th district. However, following the 2000 U.S. census redistricting, the district was moved to replace most of what had been the 3rd district.

Communities 

Under its borders from 2023 to 2033, Indiana's 2nd congressional district is located in Northern Indiana. It includes Elkhart, Fulton, Marshall, Miami, Pulaski, St. Joseph, Starke and Wabash Counties in full, most of Kosciusko and La Porte Counties, as well as half of Cass County. From 2013 to 2023, the 2nd district had the same borders except that Cass County was entirely in the 4th district.

La Porte County is split between this district and the 1st district. They are partitioned by Indiana West 500N and Indiana South/North 600W. The 2nd district takes in part of the city of LaPorte, and the 15 townships of Hanna, Johnson, Hudson, Scipio, Union, Washington, Prairie, Pleasant, Noble, Lincoln, Clinton, Center, Dewey, Wills, Center, and Kankakee.

Kosciusko County is split between this district and the 3rd district. They are partitioned by Indiana S 1000 W35, North 200W and West 700N. The 2nd district takes in the city of Warsaw, and the 14 townships of Clay, Etna, Franklin, Harrison, Jackson, Jefferson, Lake, Monroe, Plain, Prairie, Scott, Seward, Van Buren, and Wayne.

Cass County is split between this district and the 4th district. They are partitioned roughly by Indiana S Co Rd 200E, Indiana S Co Rd 500E, Indiana N Co Rd 50E, and Indiana N Co Rd 600W. The 2nd district takes in part of the city of Logansport, and the 7 townships of Adams, Bethlehem, Clay, Harrison, Jackson, Miami, Tipton, and part of the township of Deer Creek.

Largest cities
Given below are the largest cities in the district, listing every city that had at least 10,000 inhabitants as of the 2010 census.

 South Bend – 101,168
 Elkhart – 50,949
 Mishawaka – 48,252
 LaPorte – 21,732
 Warsaw – 13,559
 Peru – 11,417
 Wabash – 10,666
 Plymouth – 10,033

List of members representing the district

Election results

2002

2004

2006

2008

2010

2012

2014

2016

2018

2020

2022

See also

Indiana's congressional districts
List of United States congressional districts

References

 Congressional Biographical Directory of the United States 1774–present

02
LaPorte County, Indiana
St. Joseph County, Indiana
Porter County, Indiana
Starke County, Indiana
Marshall County, Indiana
Pulaski County, Indiana
Fulton County, Indiana
Cass County, Indiana
Carroll County, Indiana
White County, Indiana
Howard County, Indiana
Constituencies established in 1823
1823 establishments in Indiana